Surendran Pattel is an Indian born American lawyer who is a judge for the 240th Texas District Court in Fort Bend County.

Personal life 
He was born in May 29, 1971 as fourth child of his parents. He was grown up in poverty. In his early age, he rolled cigarettes. He was dropout from his school. His parents were poor and they were depended on meager wages. He is founder of a law firm.

Career 
He got law degree from University of Calicut. He began his career by starting practicing in Hosdurg taluk in 1996 and Delhi in 2005. He has also fought cases in Supreme Court of India. In 2007, when her wife was selected to work in medical center in United States, they moved to Houston.

References 

Indian lawyers
American lawyers
American judges
1971 births
People from Houston
Living people
University of Calicut alumni